The Verdun Natatorium is an Art Deco natatorium in Verdun, Quebec.

Origins
While the City of Montreal's official website states that the facility was built in 1930, the Verdun Guardian newspaper reported on the official opening on July 12, 1940 and inaugurated by Johnny Weissmuller, with the pool hosting the 1940 Dominion Swimming and Diving Championships, shortly afterward.

Finances
The city of Verdun took out a $200,000 loan to fund construction. Once open, the pool's admission revenue covered operating costs and allowed Verdun to pay back its loan. The city paid back $9,500 each year from 1941 to 1945, and approximately $11,000 each year from 1946 to 1951. By 1951, the Natatorium had never lost money and was projected to fully pay off its loan in ten more years.
Many of the workers were men that were receiving "workfare" a benefit for people out of work due to the great depression. Skilled workers such as steamfitters were paid to build the Natatorium for the city.

Facility
The city of Montreal states that the main pool can accommodate 1,150 bathers while in 1951 the Montreal Gazette, reported that the pool could handle up to 6,000 swimmers on a daily basis. This difference may be due to changes to the facility and/or safety regulations over time.  In the summer 2005, a heated wading pool was added, with a capacity of up to 250 children.

References

Art Deco architecture in Canada
Sports venues in Montreal
Swimming venues in Quebec
Verdun, Quebec